A shut-in is a type of rock formation found in streams in the Ozarks, comprising pools, rivulets, rapids and plunge pools. The term has an origin in Appalachia.

Description
A shut-in is a rock formation that carve through a mountain ranges, causing a complex of pools, rivulets, rapids and plunge pools. They are found in streams in the Ozarks. Shut-ins are inherently confined to a narrow valley or canyon, with the river valley widening out both above and below the formation. Because the rock resists downcutting, streams typically descend at relatively steep gradient through shut-ins, with the downstream terminus of the formation often marked by a very large plunge pool. The river becomes unnavigable at shut-ins even by canoe due to the rapids and narrow channels.

Etymology
The term has an origin in Appalachia, where it was used to refer to a narrow river gorge confined by resistant rock layers.

Examples
Johnson's Shut-Ins State Park in Missouri, with its hard rhyolite and a diabase dike that divert the Black River into many small streamlets following a complex joint system, is the most well known example. More than ninety other shut–ins occur within and around the St. Francois Mountains region of southeast Missouri.  In southern Illinois, the Burden Falls Wilderness area includes a narrow canyon below a waterfall that is confined by a resistant sandstone layer; the gorge is referred to as a shut–in, following the Appalachian usage for the term.

See also

References

Rivers
Ozarks